John George Johnson (1829–1896) was an English Conservative Party politician.

He was elected Conservative MP for Exeter in 1874 but was defeated at the following election in 1880.

During 1872, he was also High Sheriff of Devon. He married Frances Grace Brinckman, daughter of Sir Theodore Brinckman, 1st Baronet.

References

External links
 

1829 births
1896 deaths
Conservative Party (UK) MPs for English constituencies
UK MPs 1874–1880
High Sheriffs of Devon
Members of the Parliament of the United Kingdom for Exeter